Blok is a superhero appearing in American comic books published by DC Comics. He has a massive, stony body, as well as incredible strength and endurance.

Publication history
Blok appeared in Superboy and the Legion of Super-Heroes #253 (July 1979) by Gerry Conway and Joe Staton in an era referred to as the Bronze Age of Comic Books.

Fictional character biography
Blok first appeared as a member of the League of Super-Assassins, where he was manipulated by the Dark Man, a clone of Tharok, into attacking the Legion of Super-Heroes. Blok, possibly the last of a silicon-based species native to the planet Dryad, had been convinced by Tharok that the Legion was seeking to destroy his home world, when in fact the Legionnaires were working to save it. When he learned that the Legionnaires were not his enemies, he turned on the Assassins and eventually joined the Legion. He knew very little of the rest of his race; it was not even clear to him whether his form was that of an adult or a child.

Blok was relatively slow to acclimate to life in the Legion, though he eventually forged a close bond with two of his teammates, Timber Wolf and the White Witch, the latter with whom he spent a great deal of leisure time perusing the Legion's voluminous archives. He remained with the team for several years, eventually choosing to leave following the catastrophic Black Dawn affair and the increased scrutiny and suspicion of Earthgov towards all Legion activities. He eventually found his way to the Puppet Planetoid, where he spent a few years in isolated contemplation. Shortly thereafter Polar Boy officially disbanded the Legion of Super-Heroes.

In 2994, Blok's former teammates Rokk Krinn and Reep Daggle began to reorganize the team, a move which immediately attracted the attention of the corrupt Earthgov. To discourage and demoralize the new effort, the alien Dominators who had been secretly controlling Earthgov for years hired Roxxas to seek out and kill Blok as a warning to his other teammates. Roxxas tracked Blok down to the Puppet Planetoid and carried out his mission with ruthless efficiency, delivering Blok's dismembered corpse to the ranch home of Garth and Imra Ranzz on Winath. Far from demoralizing the other Legionnaires, however, Roxxas's act galvanized them into action, and it was directly following their discovery of Blok's murder that the Legion of Super-Heroes was officially refounded.

At the moment of his death fighting Roxxas, Blok seemed to have an out-of-body experience in which he was back on Dryad, and met Strata of L.E.G.I.O.N., who he recognized from mythology. Strata promised to finally show him the truth of his ancestral history as she led him below ground into a series of caves. Filled with joy, the gentle, philosophical Blok's last thoughts were of finally reaching enlightenment.

Post-Zero Hour
Blok did not appear in the post-Zero Hour Legion. A female Dryadian named Brika was introduced in Legionnaires #71 (May 1999), protesting a group of colonists who intend to re-settle her hibernating clan. She was then possessed by a stone elemental named Rrox, who destroyed the planet, thinking "no-one will ever colonize Dryad now".

Blok appears briefly (with several other Legionnaires from previous iterations of the team such as Tyroc and Dawnstar) as a character in a 'campfire story' showing the Legion's influence, and the urban legends and myths that have sprung up around it. This appearance was a cameo, and does not appear to take place in the series actual continuity.

Post-Infinite Crisis
Blok, along with many other pre-Crisis Legionnaires, appears as a statue in Superman's Fortress of Solitude. He also appears as a member of the Legion in the "Superman and the Legion of Super-Heroes" storyline.

In Final Crisis: Legion of 3 Worlds #2, Blok rescues Mysa from Mordru on Zerox, being aided in the rescue by Dawnstar, Wildfire, and Rond Vidar. It is revealed at this point that Blok and Mysa are in a relationship, one that was only briefly hinted at as Blok's unrequited crush in the pre-Crisis Legion. Blok helped combat the Legion of Super-Villains until he suffered major injuries at the hand of Mordru. To save him, Mysa absorbs Mordru's magicks, becoming the Black Witch, and leaves the Legion for the Sorcerer's World when the battle is over. Once his wounds are healed, Blok follows Mysa, and convinces her to let him help her use Mordru's black magic for good.

In the "Watchmen" sequel "Doomsday Clock", Blok is among the Legion of Super-Heroes members that appear in the present after Doctor Manhattan undid the experiment that erased the Legion of Super-Heroes and the Justice Society of America.

Powers and abilities
Blok's abilities fluctuated during his career. Though his enormous size and rocky form suggested super-human strength and near-invulnerability, he did not demonstrate such abilities during his first appearance. Rather, he seemed able to absorb various sorts of energy attacks, being specifically immune to Light Lass's anti-gravity powers. In his second appearance, this was specifically stated to be an ability to increase his own mass. This power seemed not entirely under his control; when he joined the Legion, it was stated that three Legion flight-rings were required to lift him. Why his teammate Colossal Boy (who could also increase his mass and size) could make do with a single flight ring, but Blok could not, was never explained.

During Blok's Legion tenure, it was stated definitely that he had massive super-human strength. Its relative limits were never made clear; it was stated that he could not match the levels of pre-Crisis Kryptonians and Daxamites or Ultra Boy, but seemed stronger than Timber Wolf and, possibly, Colossal Boy. Contrary to this, his durability was greater than that of the latter two heroes, though still not quite on Kryptonian levels. This may have been contradicted when he was able to hold his own against pre-Crisis Daxamites hand-to-hand during a Darkseid led invasion of the United Planets during the Great Darkness Saga in Legion of Super-Heroes vol. 2 #294. His recuperative abilities were likewise vague. In his earliest experiences, his body included a collar-like formation around his neck which was destroyed during the Great Darkness Saga and never regrew, but he seemed unharmed by its lack. A formation on his face that resembled a nose was likewise apparently chipped away.

Blok was also written as having the ability to communicate telepathically with other silicon-based life forms. Despite his searching, he never did find any, so this ability went unexplored.

Over time, his earlier abilities to change his mass and absorb energy were de-emphasized in favor of his super-strength. Towards the end of his life he began to mutate into a different form, larger than before and possessed of several protuberances which expelled energetic plasma from time to time. It was speculated that Blok's earlier form had been an immature, possibly larval state, and the changes in his body were actually a metamorphosis like that of a butterfly. Another supposition was that he was reaching maturity and beginning to show signs of that race's indication that he was male. A 20th century Dryadian, Strata of L.E.G.I.O.N., metamorphosed into a diamond-like version. When asked about the metamorphosis, she replied: "I guess that means I'm female".

Equipment
As a member of the Legion of Super-Heroes he is provided a Legion Flight Ring. It allows him to fly and protects him from the vacuum of space and other dangerous environments. His ring was modified to handle the increased mass of Blok as he originally has to wear three rings due to his massive size.

In other media
 Blok makes a cameo appearance in the Justice League Unlimited episode "Far From Home", among several Legionnaires being mind-controlled by the Fatal Five.
 Blok makes non-speaking cameo appearances in Legion of Super Heroes.

Reception
Jesse Murray of Syfy placed Blok as the 33rd greatest Legion member of all time, describing him as "once a misguided bad guy who saw the light". Warner Bros. producer James Tucker cited the character as a favorite character of his.

References

External links
 A Hero History Of Blok

DC Comics aliens
DC Comics characters with superhuman strength
DC Comics extraterrestrial superheroes
DC Comics supervillains
DC Comics superheroes
Comics characters introduced in 1979
Characters created by Gerry Conway
Fictional characters with superhuman durability or invulnerability